Yisroel Dovid Weiss (born 1956) is an American Haredi Jew, activist, and spokesman for a minority branch of small fringe group Neturei Karta, a Haredi anti-Zionist group. Residing in Monsey, New York, he believes that Jews should peacefully oppose the existence of the Israeli state: "It would be forbidden for us to have a State, even if it would be in a land that is desolate and uninhabited." Neturei Karta's views are rejected by the majority of Orthodox Jews worldwide.

Weiss was criticized in 2006 for his participation in the International Conference to Review the Global Vision of the Holocaust, widely considered to be an event promoting Holocaust denial internationally. His fellow speakers included David Duke, the former leader of the Ku-Klux-Klan, and numerous convicted Holocaust deniers and antisemites from Europe. He was placed under cherem (censure) by Yonah Metzger, the Ashkenazi Chief Rabbi of Israel. In addition, the anti-Zionist Satmar Hasidic dynasty also urged its members to shun him and others who participated in the conference.  Weiss claimed to be speaking as "the voice of the people who died in the Holocaust".

Biography 
His mother was originally from Poland. His father's family was from Hungary. Most of his family was killed during the Holocaust.

Anti-Zionist campaigning 
Weiss speaks at rallies and conferences in the United States and internationally, criticizing Israel and Zionism. In 2001, he attended the UN-organized World Conference against Racism in Durban, South Africa, as part of the Islamic Human Rights Commission delegation. During the conference, US and Israeli delegates walked out in protest of singling out of Israel.

In November 2006, Weiss stated at a protest in New York City that, "Zionism is a fundamentally heretical movement which denies the Divine imperative that Jews remain in exile until the day when all mankind will be miraculously redeemed". He repeated his claim at a 2011 conference in London, calling for Israel to be "dismantled" and saying the country is a "Zionist state that has kidnapped the name of Judaism". At a conference organized by the Islamist Hezbollah in Beirut on March 13, 2018, Weiss presented a "symbolic gift" to be passed to Hassan Nasrallah, the leader of the organization.

Visit to Iran, and stance on Mahmoud Ahmadinejad 
In December 2006, as part of a six-member delegation from the small fringe group Neturei Karta, Weiss spoke at the International Conference to Review the Global Vision of the Holocaust, held by the Iranian government in Tehran. It was described by media sources such as NPR and London's Jewish Chronicle as a gathering of Holocaust deniers. In his five-minute speech, Weiss addressed the issue of Holocaust denial:

Weiss stated that though Israelis have used the Holocaust to gain sympathy and advantage, he does not believe the Holocaust toll is exaggerated. Weiss said that "The Zionists use the Holocaust issue to their benefit. We, Jews who perished in the Holocaust, do not use it to advance our interests. We stress that there are hundreds of thousands [of] Jews around the world who identify with our opposition to the Zionist ideology, and who feel that Zionism is not Jewish, but a political agenda... What we want is not a withdrawal to the '67 borders, but to everything included in it, so the country can go back to the Palestinians, and we could live with them."

Weiss defended Iranian President Mahmoud Ahmadinejad against accusations of anti-Semitism. In March 2006, during a visit to Iran, Weiss released a statement to Iran's official IRIB radio in which he stated that: "It is dangerous deviation to pretend that the Iranian president is anti-Jewish and anti-Semitic. He is extremely friendly, and he understands the difference between the Zionists and the Jews who do not embrace the state of Israel." The statement added that they were "upset about the recent ploys, propaganda, and tensions which have been created by the West regarding the statements of the Iranian president Mahmoud Ahmadinejad about a world free of Zionism, since this is nothing more than wishing for a better world, dominated by peace and calm."

American Jewish organisations, including Agudath Israel of America and the Orthodox Union, issued statements distancing themselves from Weiss. The executive vice president of the Orthodox Union, Rabbi Tzvi Hersh Weinreb, has called the group "embarrassing", and Rabbi Avi Shafran, spokesman for Agudath Israel of America, called Neturei Karta's public display of affection for Mahmoud Ahmadinejad "graphic and disgusting".

After returning to the U.S. from the conference, Weiss and other individuals who attended were ostracized by synagogues, denied service at kosher stores, and subjected to disparagement in some communities with strong Haredi populations, such as Brooklyn and Monsey. A demonstration outside a Neturei Karta synagogue on January 7, 2007, was met by a counter-demonstration attended by "a much smaller contingent" of supporters of Rabbi Weiss.

Weiss's reaction to critics 
Weiss asserted that the Jewish world had misunderstood the actions of Neturei Karta. He said the organization did not appear at the conference to deny the Holocaust, but to draw a distinction between Zionists and Jews. Weiss stated that he believed Ahmadinejad is not an enemy of the Jews, but is a "God-fearing man [who] respects the Jewish people, and he protects them in Iran".

See also 
 Moshe Ber Beck

References

External links 
 Neturei Karta official website

1956 births
Living people
American Ashkenazi Jews
American Haredi rabbis
American Haredim
American people of Hungarian-Jewish descent
American people of Polish-Jewish descent
Anti-Zionist Haredi rabbis
People excommunicated by synagogues
People from Monsey, New York
Jewish anti-Zionism in the United States
21st-century American Jews